An Astro-comb is a type of frequency comb used in observational astronomy to increase the resolution of spectrographs. The resulting increase in spectral resolution allows for the detection of small variations in stellar radial velocities caused by smaller orbiting exoplanets (e.g. Earth-mass planets), among other applications. Astro-combs are distinguished from conventional frequency combs by their focus on high repetition frequencies (with mode spacings of ≥10 GHz).

A "green Astro-comb" was installed in January 2013 in the High Accuracy Radial velocity Planet Searcher in the Northern hemisphere (HARPS-N) spectrograph at the Telescopio Nazionale Galileo on the Canary Islands. The device was developed by a team led by Chih-Hao Li of Harvard University. This Astro-comb uses a pulsed laser to filter starlight before feeding the signal into a spectrograph. Currently, it is gathering data from Venus to demonstrate its ability to discover exoplanets.

See also
 Frequency comb
 Comb filter

Citations

References
New Approaches to Precision Astrophysical Spectroscopy The Walsworth Group, October 10, 2016. Accessed November 30, 2016.
TNG, HARPS-N and Astro Comb ready to characterize the first earth twin Fundación Galileo Galilei - INAF Telescopio Nazionale Galileo, July 28, 2015. Accessed December 1, 2016
 A green astro-comb to search for Earth-like planets Chih-Hao Li, SPIE, January 29, 2015. Accessed November 30, 2016.
'Astro-comb' helps search for Goldilocks planet Physorg.com, April 2, 2008. Accessed April 2, 2008.
Astro-combing for Planets Astro Biology Magazine, April 9, 2008. Accessed April 11, 2008.
Pulses to Find Planets, (Archive of Pulses to Find Planets Astro Biology Magazine, May 11, 2008. Accessed May 15, 2008.  Based on a National Institute of Standards and Technology news release.)

Astronomical spectroscopy